Edward Feldman may refer to:
 Edward S. Feldman (1929–2020), American film and television producer
 Edward H. Feldman (1920–1988), American television director and producer